Bellum Valley is a small valley east of Banna Ridge in the northwest part of the Britannia Range. The valley entrance is adjacent to the head of Hatherton Glacier. It was named in association with Britannia by a University of Waikato geological party, 1978–79, led by Michael Selby; "Bellum" is a historical placename formerly used in Roman Britain.

References
 

Valleys of Oates Land